Vabole Parish is an administrative unit of Augšdaugava Municipality in the Latgale region of Latvia.

Towns, villages and settlements of Vabole Parish 
 Vabole

 
Parishes of Latvia
Latgale